Einar Tveito (April 14, 1890 – January 19, 1958) was a Norwegian actor.

Tveito was born in Lårdal, Norway. He debuted as an actor in 1920 in Fante-Anne, and he appeared in 13 films until 1944.

Filmography

Actor 
 1920: Fante-Anne as Jon Sandbakken, a smallholder
 1926: Glomdalsbruden as Gjermund Haugsett
 1927: Troll-elgen as Gunnar Sløvika, a horse dealer 
 1928: Viddenes folk as Lapp-Nils 
 1933: Jeppe på bjerget as Jesper, an estate manager 
 1934: Sangen om Rondane as a horse dealer
 1936: Norge for folket as Berg, a merchant 
 1936: Vi vil oss et land...  as Per Lium, a smallholder
 1937: Fant as Josefa's uncle 
 1939: Gjest Baardsen as Mathias Strandvik 
 1940: Godvakker-Maren as the priest 
 1943: Unge viljer as Bjørn Storhaug, a farmer 
 1944: Villmarkens lov as Jo Waldor, a reindeer thief

Scriptwriter 
 1940: Godvakker-Maren

Production manager 
 1934: Sangen om Rondane

References

External links

Einar Tveito at Filmfront
Einar Tveito at the Swedish Film Database
Einar Tveito at the Danish Film Database

1890 births
1958 deaths
Norwegian male stage actors
Norwegian male film actors
Norwegian male silent film actors
20th-century Norwegian male actors
People from Tokke